Leonard James Keyworth VC (12 August 1893 – 19 October 1915) was an English recipient of the Victoria Cross, the highest and most prestigious award for gallantry in the face of the enemy that can be awarded to British and Commonwealth forces.

Details
Son of James and Emma Keyworth, of Lincoln. He was a Lance-Corporal in the 24th (County of London) Battalion (The Queen’s), The London Regiment, British Army during the First World War.

On 25/26 May 1915 at Givenchy, France, 21-year-old Keyworth performed an act of bravery for which he was awarded the Victoria Cross. Others involved in that incident were Captain Donald Figg and Private Herbert John Hodgson. Keyworth was also awarded the Medal of St. George (2nd Class) of Russia.

Citation

He later achieved the rank of Corporal, but was killed in action at Abbeville, France, on 19 October 1915. He is buried at Abbeville Communal Cemetery.

Further information
This medal is currently in a private collection.

References

1893 births
1915 deaths
Military personnel from Lincolnshire
London Regiment soldiers
British World War I recipients of the Victoria Cross
British Army personnel of World War I
British military personnel killed in World War I
People from Lincoln, England
British Army recipients of the Victoria Cross
Recipients of the Medal of St. George
Burials at the Abbeville Communal Cemetery